The Minister of Federal/Provincial Relations is a cabinet minister in the province of Manitoba, Canada.

The position has existed since the 1960s, and has always been held by the Premier of Manitoba.  The minister is responsible for representing the Executive Council of Manitoba in discussions with the Government of Canada.

The last minister was Greg Selinger.

List of Ministers of Federal/Provincial Relations in Manitoba

Sources:  

It is not clear if Premiers Walter Weir, Edward Schreyer, Sterling Lyon and Howard Pawley also took the title of Minister of Federal/Provincial Relations.

Federal Provincial Relations, Minister of